The Battle of Tendra was a naval action fought on 8 and 9 September 1790 in the Black Sea as part of the Russo-Turkish War (1787–1792). It ended in a victory for the Russians over the Ottomans.

Battle
The Russian fleet of 10 Ships of the line, 6 frigates and small craft sailed from Sevastopol on 5 September under Fyodor Ushakov for Kherson to pick up some frigates. At 6 a.m. on 8 September it encountered the Ottoman fleet of 14 battleships, 8 frigates and 23 small crafts at anchor near Tendra. As the Ottomans formed into a battle line, the Russian fleet sailed toward the tail end of the Ottoman line in 3 parallel lines, forming into one line as they did so.

The Ottoman admiral, Hussein Pasha, seeing his tail threatened, turned north and came back parallel to the Russians, who followed suit so the two fleets ended up on paralleled tracks, heading north-east. This was completed by about 2 p.m.. Ushakov ordered 3 frigates to the off-battle side of the van to guard against an Ottoman doubling of the Russian line (Ottoman ships of the period were usually coppered and therefore several knots faster than Russian ships), leaving 13 ships of 710 guns in his line, opposed to 14 with 900 guns. Ushakov then turned toward the Ottoman ships and firing began at about 3 p.m..

The Ottomans began to bear away and by 6 p.m. were in full retreat. The Russians followed closely, inflicting much damage - in particular, the Ottoman Vice Admiral's ship was attacked by Ioann Bogoslov, and the Admiral's and Rear-Admiral's ships by Rozhdestvo Christovo and Preobrazhenie Gospodne. The Ottomans speed allowed them to get away though, and soon after 8 p.m. firing ceased and the Russians anchored.

The next day, 2 damaged Ottoman ships, the Kapitana (Vice Admiral's ship) and Melike Bahri were seen close by, and the Russians attacked. Melike Bahri surrendered to Maria Magdalina without resistance, but the "Kapitana" put up a stout resistance. At 10 a.m. she was attacked by Sv. Andrei Pervozvannyi, which brought down her fore topsail, then by Sv. Georgii Pobyedonosets, Preobrazhenie Gospodne and others. By noon she was completely surrounded, but fought on. At 2 p.m. Ushakov in Rozhdestvo Christovo shot away all her masts and placed his ship across her bows, and at 3 p.m. she surrendered. Unfortunately she was seen to be on fire, and blew up after only 20 men, including Said Bey and her captain, had been taken off. Only 101 men were saved out of 800 on board.

Some Russian ships had been chasing the rest of the Ottoman fleet but they were losing ground and at about 4:30 p.m. Ushakov recalled them. Russian privateers later brought in 3 small craft. Russian casualties were 25 killed and 25 wounded, and 733 Ottomans were captured. Several ships had minor damage in their masts and rigging. Russian victory in the Battle of Tendra allowed them to control the Black Sea. 

Ships involved

Russia
Rozhdestvo Christovo 84 (flag of Vice-Admiral Fyodor Ushakov)
Maria Magdalina 66
Preobrazhenie Gospodne 66
Sv. Pavel 66
Sv. Vladimir 66
Sv. Aleksandr Nevskii 50
Sv. Andrei Pervozvannyi 50
Sv. Georgii Pobyedonosets 50
Ioann Bogoslov 46
Sv. Petr Apostol 46
Fanagoria 40
Kinburn 40
Legkii 40
Perun 40
Stryela 40
Taganrog 40
Rozhdestvo Christovo (bomb)
Polotsk
2 fireships
17 privateers

Ottoman Empire
Bahr-i Zafer 72 (flag of Kapudan Pasha Giritli Hüseyin)
Melik-i Bahri 72 (flag of Patrona Bey) Sank at storm on the night of 8–9 September
Anka-i Bahri 72
Fethü'l Fettah 66 
Nüvid-i Fütuh 66
Peleng-i Bahri 66 Captured 9 September
Tevfikullah 66
Feyz-i Hüda 66 (flag of Riyale Bey)
Mesudiye 58
Mansuriye 58 (flag of Kapudane Said Bey) Blew up 9 September
Inayet-i Hakk 58
Burc-ı Zafer 52
Şehbaz-ı Bahri 52
Ukâb-ı Bahri 52
Mazhar-ı Hidâyet 38
Mazhar-ı Saadet 38
Mebdâ-i Nusret 32
Raad-ı Bahri 20 (bomb frigate)
Berk-i Bahri 20 (bomb frigate)
Berk-i Hafız 20 (bomb frigate)
Şihab-ı Sakıb 20 (bomb frigate)
Cedid Bomba 20 (bomb frigate)
23 small craft (kırlangıç, pergende (brigantine) and şehtiye (xebec) type ships) 3 were captured 9 September

References

Sources
 

Tendra
Tendra
Military history of the Black Sea